"Anyone Seen the Bridge?" (abbreviated as "ASTB") is an instrumental by the Dave Matthews Band, usually played as segue between two songs during a concert.  It is an instrumental jam played by the entire band, with scat singing by Dave Matthews.  Performances of the tune today typically are heard between "So Much to Say" and "Too Much," and last around a minute and a half.  The tune has been very popular during concerts since its debut, and has currently been played live over 400 times.

The tune originated from a funky jam performed by the band with guest Mike Doughty from Soul Coughing, immediately after "So Much to Say" at a concert on October 3, 1996. The band liked the jam, and it was performed the following night with Doughty after "So Much to Say," and lasted almost seven minutes.  When the jam was first played, the band's crew felt it sounded very similar to the Led Zeppelin song "The Crunge," which features the lyrics "Has anybody seen the bridge?" so the tune was dubbed "Anyone Seen the Bridge?" by the band's crew and the name stuck.  At the band's following show on October 6, the band used the tune as a brief segue between "So Much to Say" and "Too Much," and it was so popular that it is frequently played at concerts between those two songs up to the present day.

On the band's 1998 album Before These Crowded Streets, "Anyone Seen the Bridge?" was teased into the jam at the end of the track, "Pig."  In 2000, the band played the tune several times after "So Much to Say," which segued into a "fake" version of "Too Much" lasting for a few seconds, which then segued into "Ants Marching."  Beginning with the band's summer tour in 2000, the band began to segue the tune into a variety of other songs after performing "So Much to Say."  The jam has only opened a show three times, those being July 31, 2004, August 23, 2007, and June 29, 2019.

Live releases
Live in Chicago 12.19.98
The Central Park Concert
The Gorge
Live Trax Vol. 1
Live Trax Vol. 2
Weekend on the Rocks
Live Trax Vol. 6
Live Trax Vol. 7
Live Trax Vol. 10
Live at Piedmont Park
Live Trax Vol. 11
Live at Mile High Music Festival
Live Trax Vol. 14
Live Trax Vol. 15
Live Trax Vol. 17
Live Trax Vol. 19
Europe 2009 - Across The Pond DVD
Live Trax Vol. 29

References 

Dave Matthews Band songs
Rock instrumentals
1996 songs
Songs written by Dave Matthews